Dena Takruri (Arabic: دينا تكروري) is a Palestinian American journalist, on-air presenter, and producer with AJ+, Al Jazeera Media Network's all-digital video news network based in San Francisco, California.

She is the host of the award-winning docuseries "Direct From with Dena Takruri," AJ+'s field documentary team focusing on international and domestic breaking news, issues, and social justice movements.

The videos Takruri hosts range in format from in-studio explainers that provide context to the news stories, to interviews with experts and stakeholders, and even ground reports from where news is breaking. Subjects she’s covered include the Israeli-Palestinian conflict, the #BlackLivesMatter movement in the U.S., police brutality, mass incarceration and the 2016 presidential election.

Early life 
Dena Takruri is of Palestinian descent. She completed her Graduate studies at Georgetown University in Arab Studies. Takruri is a graduate of Lowell High School.

Career
Dena Takruri began her broadcast career in 2007 as co-host and producer on a weekly hour-long satellite television program called "What's Happening" that aired on Arab Radio and Television Network (ART). The show, which aired in North America, focused on current political, cultural and social issues related to Arab-Americans.

She also worked as a research assistant with Dr. Rochelle Davis of Georgetown University between January 2007 and April 2008. One of her duties included interviewing U.S. military personnel who served in Iraq for a project on their perceptions of Iraqi culture and U.S. military cultural training. The findings of this research were presented at a historians’ conference in Atlanta, Georgia, in April 2008. They were ultimately published in a chapter of a book titled "Anthropology and Global Counter Insurgency." In 2008, Takruri also contributed Arabic-to-English translations for the award-winning feature documentary film "Budrus."

Takruri joined Al Jazeera Arabic in Washington D.C. in 2008 as a producer on its weekly live current affairs show hosted by Abderrahim Foukara that examines the impact of U.S. politics on the Arab region. There, she produced interviews with prominent political figures including Donald Rumsfeld, Robert Gates, Dominique Strauss-Kahn, Tony Blair, John McCain, and Mahmoud Ahmadinejad. Takruri joined HuffPost Live, the online streaming network of the Huffington Post, as a producer and host in June 2012. She was part of the original launch team and covered global affairs, politics, lifestyle and culture. She is now a presenter and producer at  AJ+, Al Jazeera's all digital video news network targeted towards millennials.

Takruri has reported domestically from Charleston, South Carolina in the aftermath of the church shooting. She also covered the armed occupation of the federal wildlife reserve in Oregon and the water crisis in Flint, Michigan. Internationally, Takruri covered Europe's refugee crisis, embedding with refugees and crossing borders with them while broadcasting in English and Arabic. She also reported from the West Bank during intensified tensions in the fall of 2015. Her videos have gone viral, netting millions of views on Facebook and hundreds of thousands of shares on YouTube.

Direct From with Dena Takruri
Since June 2015, Takruri has been the host of the AJ+ field docuseries "Direct From with Dena Takruri." The show focuses on both international and domestic breaking news, issues and social justice movements. Past episodes have covered the Korean Demilitarized Zone, the  Cape Town water crisis, the Catalan independence movement and homelessness in Skid Row, Los Angeles.

"Direct From with Dena Takruri" has been recognized by multiple awards, including two Edward R. Murrow Awards (Radio Television Digital News Association), Webby Award, Shorty Awards, and Clarion Award.

Takruri was one of the first journalists who interviewed Ahed Tamimi after her release from Israeli prison.

Languages
Takruri is proficient in Arabic and English, with limited working capability in Spanish and Hebrew.

Personal life
Takruri is a Muslim.

References

External links
 
 
  Meet Dena Takruri from AJ+
 Takruri report on AIPAC lobbying
 Direct From with Dena Takruri

Living people
People from San Francisco
Al Jazeera people
American people of Palestinian descent
American Muslims
Walsh School of Foreign Service alumni
University of California, Berkeley alumni
1983 births